ABLV Bank was one of the largest private banks in the Baltic States, headquartered in Riga, Latvia with representative offices abroad from 1993 to 2018.

Following accusations of money laundering by the United States Department of the Treasury and continued pressure from national regulatory agencies, on 26 February 2018 the ABLV board voted to start the process of voluntary liquidation. The liquidation plan was approved on June 12th. 

ABLV had three primary lines of business: private banking, investment and financial planning.

History 

The bank was founded on 17 September 1993 on the basis of the Bank of Latvia regional branch in the city of Aizkraukle, thus the bank was named Aizkraukles Banka.

The path in the top three of the largest banks of Latvia 
Also in 1995, the bank started expanding its activities and founded a branch in Riga.
In the following years, the bank worked in the field of providing services to foreign customers, offering them various banking products, mainly related to funds transferring service.

In 2002 the AB.LV trademark was created.

In 2004, the bank focused on developing a second line of its primary activities — investment management. Two subsidiary companies were founded: ABLV Asset Management, IPAS, dealing with investment management, and ABLV Capital Markets, IBAS, which provided brokerage services.

In 2008, the bank adopted a new strategy, emphasizing development of bespoke financial solutions for customers. Since 2009, the bank offered a third line of services — advisory on asset protection and structuring.

In 2011 the bank's name was changed to ABLV Bank. 
The new brand and name was intended for increasing association with the chosen lines of business, strengthening the bank's reputation internationally, meanwhile retaining links to the former brand.

In 2012, ABLV Bank Luxembourg subsidiaries received a license for banking activities in Luxembourg.

In 2013, ABLV Bank celebrated its 20th anniversary, and a representative office was opened in Cyprus. Euromoney magazine recognized ABLV Bank as the best bank of Latvia.

The group continued to grow and by 2021, ABLV Group consisted of several companies — ABLV Bank, ABLV Bank Luxembourg, ABLV Asset Management, ABLV Capital Markets, ABLV Corporate Services, ABLV Consulting Services, and Pillar Holding Company. Financial indicators as at 31 December 2012:
 Net profit of ABLV Group amounted to EUR 23,4 million.
 Total amount of deposits with ABLV Bank equaled EUR 2.66 billion.
 Amount of ABLV Bank assets totaled EUR 3.04 billion.

In 2014, ABLV Bank started to be directly supervised by the European Central Bank in cooperation with the National Regulator – the Financial and Capital Market Commission (FCMC, FKTK) within the frames of the ECB's single supervisory mechanism.

In 2015 ABLV group opened a representative office in Hong Kong.

2016, an exporter support organization - The Red Jackets - recognized the bank as one of the best Latvian exporter brands. In terms of assets and turnover, the Bank entered the top three in Latvia after Swedbank and SEB. ABLV Bank bonds were quoted on the list of securities exchange Nasdaq Riga.

In 2016, the United States Department of Justice alleged that Gulnara Karimova fraudulantly received $800 million and some of it had been through ABLV Bank and Parex Bank for companies linked to her by three telecommunications operators in Uzbekistan.

In 2017, Sally Painter of Blue Star Strategies and who had previously worked at Parex Bank allegedly intermediated a secret payment from Latvia to Anders Aslund, who was on the Atlantic Council, for him to write an article which stated that ABLV Bank had not been involved in money laundering. Previously in 2011, Dombrovskis and Aslund were authors of a book which praised Dombrovskis role at ABLV Bank and falsely denounced Sweden for the collapse of ABLV Bank.

Destruction of bank 
Since 2018, ABLV is in voluntary liquidation.

On February 13, 2018, the FinCEN (Financial Crimes Enforcement Network of the US Department of Treasury) published a message with a variety of accusations against ABLV — from suspicions of complicity in money laundering and avoiding currency controls to assisting North Korea in implementation of its nuclear program. Despite the fact that the "accused" had the right to reasonably respond to this message within 60 days, which was done in April 2018 by FinCEN. On February 24, 2018, the European Central Bank (ECB) announced that ABLV will be liquidated in accordance with the laws of Latvia.

The Latvian authorities did nothing to protect the largest bank with national capital, and Finance Minister Dana Reizniece-Ozola and Prime Minister Māris Kučinskis were quick to declare that the liquidation of the bank would not harm the economy; at the same time, the Luxembourg Commercial Court rejected the request of the Luxembourg regulator to liquidate ABLV Bank Luxembourg.

In the report of the lawyers of the American branch of the international company WimerHale, attracted by the bank, it was indicated that FinCEN not only failed to prove the accusations against the Latvian bank, but did not even study the money laundering prevention system created in the bank and ignored its significant improvements in recent years. The letter was signed by David Cohen, former CIA Deputy Director and Comptroller of FinCEN, now a partner at WilmerHale.

After suspending the license, the Bank's shareholders decided on the bank's self-destruction, although insolvency administrators and lawyers claimed participation in the process that filling them a big score — more than 40 applications were submitted to the Commission on the securities market and capital.

Publisher Sandris Cottles, who led an independent investigation into the consequences of FinCEN's statement, drew attention to strange signals from the Ministry of Finance of Latvia: his parliamentary secretary stated that it was possible not to allow the bank to self-destruct. "You should not be surprised if the information flows in the near future is to undermine the reputation of the ABLV Bank owners to create an opinion that it is impossible to trust it with liquidation," said C. Capiles, recalling that society is perplexed why they eliminated this sufficiently healthy Latvian enterprise with almost a thousand employees only because someone on another continent expressed some vague suspicions.

A year after these events, the head of the financial regulator FKTK Pēteris Putniņš stated in an interview with Publicist Sandris to the Cups: "Our goal is to achieve the  FinCEN message from 13.02. 2018 was withdrawn. "He admitted that the deposits of non-residents who left Latvia (and their outflow amounted to billions of Euros) went to Estonia, Germany, the Czech Republic, the United Kingdom, the United States, Cyprus, Malta, etc.

Headquarters 
The main office of ABLV Bank is situated in the so-called quiet center of Riga, in an Art Nouveau tenement house dating back to the beginning of the 20th century. The author of the house is architect-engineer Mr. Hibig, while facades were designed by Mr. Giesecke.

ABLV is represented in 9 foreign countries (Russia, Ukraine, Belarus, Kazakhstan, Azerbaijan, Uzbekistan, Hong Kong, Cyprus and Luxemburg) — 11 representative offices in different cities and the subsidiary bank in Luxembourg ABLV Bank Luxembourg, S.A. The bank's 34-page response contained more than 170 references to US law, court decisions, materials of Congress, internal documents of the bank and other documents.

Lines of business 
ABLV Bank provides wide range of banking products and services: 
 Settlement and Cash Services;
 Payment Cards;
 Remote Account Management;
 Loans;
 Documentary Operations;
 Fiduciary Transactions;
 Safe Deposit Boxes
 
ABLV group renders investment management and brokerage services, such as: 
 Deposits; Bank Bonds, Mutual Funds;
 Asset Management;
 Brokerage Services;
 Securities Custody.
 
Providing advisory services, ABLV group offer legal and tax solutions for protection and efficient management of customer's assets: 
 Asset Protection;
 Charitable Foundations;
 Commercial Companies;
 Legal Advice;
 Tax Advice;
 Administrative Services.

Shareholders 
The bank's controlling interest was held by Ernests Bernis (43%) and Oļegs Fiļs (43%). The bank's other shareholders include top management, employees, and the bank's long-term partners and customers.

ABLV Bank is a member of the Association of Latvian Commercial Banks, which protects interests of Latvian banks both in domestic and foreign markets, certifies banking specialists.

Sanctions
ABLV was sanctioned by the United States for facilitating prohibited transactions for North Korea. The bank has been banned from the American financial network. Bill Browder has alleged that the bank was being used by Russians for money laundering purposes, a complaint being investigated by the European Central Bank and the Latvian Anti-Laundering authority.

See also

 Parex Bank
 Banka Baltija

References

External links
 

Banks of Latvia
Banks established in 1993
Companies based in Riga
Latvian companies established in 1993
Defunct banks of Latvia
Banks disestablished in 2018
2018 disestablishments in Latvia